R.T. James McAteer is an American solar physicist. He the Senior Associate Provost and Professor of Astronomy at New Mexico State University where he studies the coronal heating problem and space weather. McAteer is the director of Sunspot Solar Observatory, is the author of the book "The Planets", and has published over 100 research articles.

Academy Leadership 

Dr McAteer was appointed as the first Senior Associate Provost at NMSU in August 2022. Dr McAteer was Department chair of Astronomy from 2021-2022, including oversight of Apache Point Observatory and Sloan Digital Sky Survey. In 2020 he was appointed to the New Mexico State Commission for Space History. He is the current Director of Sunspot Solar Observatory.

Education 
Dr McAteer graduated from Queen's University Belfast with a Masters in Physics with Astrophysics in 2000. He completed his Ph. D. from Queen's University Belfast with this thesis Low Frequency Oscillations of the Solar Atmosphere. in 2004.

Career 
McAteer is a Professor of Astronomy at New Mexico State University. After completing his thesis, he moved to NASA Goddard Space Flight Center from 2004 to 2008, as a NASA STEREO scientist. He won a European Union Marie Curie Fellowship in 2008, which he took at Trinity College Dublin. He started at New Mexico State University in 2010, and became the director of the newly formed Sunspot Solar Observatory in 2016. 

He is noted for wide-ranging contributions to solar physics and space plasma physics, including chromospheric heating, space weather and turbulence. His research includes cross disciplinary papers in image processing, computer vision and big data. His research includes the subject of spectropolarimetry. He was awarded a NSF Career award in 2013.

National Recognition 

He was a member of the 2020 National Academy of Science Decadel Survey in Astrophysics.

In 2019 he published "The Planets".

He was awarded the NMSU "Truly Innovative Teaching" Award from New Mexico State University in 2022.

References

External links 
 

1978 births
Living people
New Mexico State University faculty
American astrophysicists
Alumni of Queen's University Belfast
American physicists
20th-century American physicists
21st-century American physicists
NASA astrophysicists